Isaiah 38 is the thirty-eighth chapter of the Book of Isaiah in the Hebrew Bible or the Old Testament of the Christian Bible. This book contains the prophecies attributed to the prophet Isaiah, and is one of the Books of the Prophets.

Text 
The original text was written in Hebrew language. This chapter is divided into 22 verses.

Textual witnesses
Some early manuscripts containing the text of this chapter in Hebrew are of the Masoretic Text tradition, which includes the Codex Cairensis (895), the Petersburg Codex of the Prophets (916), Aleppo Codex (10th century), Codex Leningradensis (1008).

Fragments containing parts of this chapter were found among the Dead Sea Scrolls (3rd century BC or later):
 1QIsaa: complete
 1QIsab: extant: verses 12, 14‑22

There is also a translation into Koine Greek known as the Septuagint, made in the last few centuries BCE. Extant ancient manuscripts of the Septuagint version include Codex Vaticanus (B; B; 4th century), Codex Sinaiticus (S; BHK: S; 4th century), Codex Alexandrinus (A; A; 5th century) and Codex Marchalianus (Q; Q; 6th century).

Parashot
The parashah sections listed here are based on the Aleppo Codex. Isaiah 38 is a part of the Narrative (Isaiah 36–39). {P}: open parashah; {S}: closed parashah.
 {S} 38:1-3 {S} 38:4-8 {S} 38:9-22 {S}

Verse 8
Behold, I will bring again the shadow of the degrees, which is gone down in the sun dial of Ahaz, ten degrees backward. So the sun returned ten degrees, by which degrees it was gone down.

In the parallel account in the Second Book of Kings, Hezekiah is given a choice of whether to see the shadow move forward ten degrees or move backward ten degrees, and he chooses the more challenging backward option.

See also
 Ahaz
 Hezekiah
 Isaiah, son of Amoz
 Jerusalem
 Kingdom of Judah
Related Bible parts: Exodus 9, Leviticus 13, Deuteronomy 28, 2 Kings 20, 2 Chronicles 32, Isaiah 39, Jeremiah 8, Jonah 3

References

Bibliography

External links

Jewish
Isaiah 38 Hebrew with Parallel English

Christian
Isaiah 38 English Translation with Parallel Latin Vulgate

38